Teodor Ivanov Teodorov (8 April 1859, Elena – 5 August 1924) was a leading Bulgarian politician and legal expert who served as Prime Minister of Bulgaria immediately after the First World War.

He was Minister of Finance from 1897 to 1899 and from 1911 to 1913. 

Teodorov first came to prominence through his support for reform of the Bulgarian legal system and took part in a Commission set up in 1911 that eventually produced the Administrative Justice Law that established a Supreme Court.

He was called in to head a coalition government after the resignation of Aleksandar Malinov on 28 November 1918 and struggled to keep order in the defeated country. Initially an opponent of Aleksandar Stamboliyski, he was later forced to admit the Agrarian Peoples Union leader into the Cabinet and was ultimately succeeded as Prime Minister by him. Teodorov was to play no further role in Bulgarian politics.

Notes

 

1859 births
1924 deaths
Chairpersons of the National Assembly of Bulgaria
People from Elena, Bulgaria
People's Party (Bulgaria) politicians
Prime Ministers of Bulgaria
Finance ministers of Bulgaria
20th-century Bulgarian politicians